The 1956–57 Cypriot Second Division was the fourth season of the Cypriot second-level football league. Apollon Limassol won their 1st title.

Format
Nine teams participated in the 1956–57 Cypriot Second Division. The league was split into two geographical groups, depending from which Districts of Cyprus each participated team came from. All teams of each group played against each other twice, once at their home and once away. The team with the most points at the end of the season were crowned group champions. The winners of each group played against each other in the final phase of the competition and the winner were the champions of the Second Division. The champion was promoted to the 1957–58 Cypriot First Division. 

Teams received two points for a win, one point for a draw and zero points for a loss.

Changes from previous season
Teams promoted to 1956–57 Cypriot First Division
 Aris Limassol

Teams relegated from 1955–56 Cypriot First Division
 Armenian Young Men's Association

New members of CFA
 Othellos Famagusta

Stadiums and locations

Nicosia-Famagusta-Larnaca-Keryneia Group
League standings

Results

Limassol-Paphos Group
League standings

Results

Champions playoffs 
Apollon Limassol 4 – 1 Alki Larnaca (GSO Stadium, June 30, 1957)
Alki Larnaca 2 – 2 Apollon Limassol (GSZ Stadium, July 7, 1956)

Apollon Limassol were the champions of the Second Division and they were promoted to 1957–58 Cypriot First Division.

See also
 Cypriot Second Division
 1956–57 Cypriot First Division

Sources 

Cypriot Second Division seasons
Cyprus
1956–57 in Cypriot football